Goodnight Moon is an American children's book written by Margaret Wise Brown and illustrated by Clement Hurd. It was published on September 3, 1947, and is a highly acclaimed bedtime story.

This book is the second in Brown and Hurd's "classic series", which also includes The Runaway Bunny and My World. The three books have been published together as a collection titled Over the Moon.

Publication history
Illustrator Clement Hurd said in 1983 that initially the book was to be published using the pseudonym "Memory Ambrose" for Brown, with his illustrations credited to "Hurricane Jones".

Goodnight Moon had poor initial sales: only 6,000 copies were sold upon initial release in fall 1947. Anne Carroll Moore, the influential children's librarian at the New York Public Library (NYPL), regarded it as "overly sentimental". The NYPL and other libraries did not acquire it at first. During the post-World War II Baby Boom years, it slowly became a bestseller. Annual sales grew from about 1,500 copies in 1953 to almost 20,000 in 1970; by 1990, the total number of copies sold exceeded 4 million. , the book sells about 800,000 copies annually and by 2017 had cumulatively sold an estimated 48 million copies. Goodnight Moon has been translated into French, Dutch, Chinese, Japanese, Catalan, Hebrew, Brazilian Portuguese, Russian, Swedish, Korean, Hmong, German and Spanish.

Brown, who died in 1952, bequeathed the royalties to the book (among many others) to Albert Clarke, who was the nine-year-old son of a neighbor when Brown died. Clarke, who squandered the millions of dollars the book earned him, said that Brown was his mother, a claim others dismiss.

In 2005, publisher HarperCollins digitally altered the photograph of illustrator Hurd, which had been on the book for at least twenty years, to remove a cigarette. Its editor-in-chief for children's books, Kate Jackson, said, "It is potentially a harmful message to very young [children]." HarperCollins had the reluctant permission of Hurd's son, Thacher Hurd, but the younger Hurd said the photo of Hurd with his arm and fingers extended, holding nothing, "looks slightly absurd to me".

Other editions 
In addition to several octavo and duodecimo paperback editions, Goodnight Moon is available as a board book and in "jumbo" edition designed for use with large groups.
 1991, US, HarperFestival , Pub date September 30, 1991, board book
 1997, US, HarperCollins , Pub date February 28, 1997, Hardback 50th anniversary edition
 2007, US, HarperCollins , Pub date January 23, 2007, Board book 60th anniversary edition

In 2008, Thacher Hurd used his father's artwork from Goodnight Moon to produce Goodnight Moon 123: A Counting Book. In 2010, HarperCollins used artwork from the book to produce Goodnight Moon's ABC: An Alphabet Book.

In 2015, Loud Crow Interactive Inc. released a Goodnight Moon interactive app.

Synopsis
The text is a rhyming poem, describing an anthropomorphic bunny's bedtime ritual of saying "good night" to various inanimate and living objects in the bunny's bedroom: a red balloon, a pair of socks, the bunny's dollhouse, a bowl of mush, and two kittens, among others; despite the kittens, a mouse is present in each spread. The book begins at 7:00 PM, and ends at 8:10 PM, with each spread being spaced 10 minutes apart, as measured by the two clocks in the room, and reflected (improbably) in the rising moon. The illustrations alternate between 2-page black-and-white spreads of objects and 2-page color spreads of the room, like the other books in the series; this was a common cost-saving technique at the time.

Allusions and references
Goodnight Moon contains a number of references to Brown and Hurd's The Runaway Bunny, and to traditional children's literature. For example, the room of Goodnight Moon generally resembles the next-to-last spread of The Runaway Bunny, where the little bunny becomes a little boy and runs into a house, and the mother bunny becomes the little boy's mother; shared details include the fireplace and the painting by the fireplace of "The Cow Jumping Over the Moon", though other details differ (the colors of the walls and floor are switched, for instance). The painting is itself a reference to the nursery rhyme "Hey Diddle Diddle", where a cow jumps over the moon. However, when reprinted in Goodnight Moon, the udder was reduced to an anatomical blur to avoid the controversy that E.B. White's Stuart Little had undergone when published in 1945. The painting of three bears, sitting in chairs, alludes to "Goldilocks and the Three Bears" (originally "The Story of the Three Bears"), and itself has a copy of the cow jumping over the moon painting. The other painting in the room, which is never explicitly mentioned in the text, portrays a bunny fly-fishing for another bunny, using a carrot as bait. This picture is also a reference to The Runaway Bunny, where it is the first colored spread, when the mother says that if the little bunny becomes a fish, she will become a fisherman and fish for him. The top shelf of the bookshelf, below the Runaway Bunny painting, holds an open copy of The Runaway Bunny, and there is a copy of Goodnight Moon on the nightstand.

A telephone is mentioned early in the book. The primacy of the reference to the telephone indicates that the bunny is in his mother's room and his mother's bed.

Literary significance and reception
In a 2007 online poll, the National Education Association listed the book as one of its "Teachers' Top 100 Books for Children". In 2012 it was ranked number four among the "Top 100 Picture Books" in a survey published by School Library Journal.

From the time of its publication in 1947 and until 1972, the book was "banned" by the New York Public Library due to the then head children's librarian Anne Carroll Moore's hatred of the book. Moore was considered a top taste-maker and arbiter of children's books not only in the New York Public Library, but for libraries nationwide in the United States, even well past her official retirement. The book was stocked on the library's shelves only in 1972, at the time of the 25th anniversary of its publication. It did not appear on the NYPL's 2020 list of the 10 most-checked-out books in the library's history.

Author Susan Cooper writes that the book is possibly the only "realistic story" to gain the universal affection of a fairy-tale, although she also noted that it is actually a "deceptively simple ritual" rather than a story.

Writer Ellen Handler Spitz suggests that Goodnight Moon teaches "young children that life can be trusted, that life has stability, reliability, and durability."

Writer Robin Bernstein suggests that Goodnight Moon is popular largely because it helps parents put children to sleep. Bernstein distinguishes between "going-to-bed" books that help children sleep and "bedtime books" that use nighttime as a theme. Goodnight Moon, Bernstein argues, is both a bedtime book and a going-to-bed book, whereas Maurice Sendak's Where the Wild Things Are is a bedtime book because it "has as much potential to excite as to tranquilize child readers."

Animated adaptation
In 1985, Weston Woods released a filmstrip adaptation of the book.

On July 15, 1999, Goodnight Moon was adapted into a 26-minute animated family video special/documentary, which debuted on HBO Family in December of that year, and was released on VHS on April 15, 2000, and DVD in 2005, in the United States. The special features an animated short of Goodnight Moon, narrated by Susan Sarandon, along with six other animated segments of children's bedtime stories and lullabies with live-action clips of children reflecting on a series of bedtime topics in between, a reprise of Goodnight Moon at the end, and the Everly Brothers' "All I Have To Do Is Dream" playing over the closing credits. The special is notable for its post-credits clip, which features a boy being interviewed about dreams but stumbling over his sentence, which soon became a meme in 2011 when it was uploaded on YouTube. He was referencing a line from the 1997 Disney animated film Hercules. The boy's identity was unknown until July 2021, when he came forward as Joseph Cirkiel in a video interview with Youtuber wavywebsurf. 

Here are the other tales and lullabies featured in the video:
 Lullaby: "Hit the Road to Dreamland" sung by Tony Bennett (This lullaby plays in the opening credits, right before Goodnight Moon.)
 Lullaby: "Hush, Little Baby" sung by Lauryn Hill
 Story: There's a Nightmare in My Closet narrated by Billy Crystal
 Story: Tar Beach narrated by Natalie Cole
 Lullaby: "Brahms' Lullaby" sung by Aaron Neville
 Lullaby: "Twinkle, Twinkle, Little Star" sung by Patti LaBelle

Musical adaptation
In 2012, American composer Eric Whitacre obtained the copyright holder's permission to set the words to music, and did so initially for a soprano, specifically his then wife Hila Plitmann, with harp and string orchestra. He subsequently arranged it for soprano and piano, SSA (two soprano lines plus alto; commissioned by the National Children's Chorus), and SATB (commissioned by a consortium of choirs).

In popular culture 
The first episode of the Warner Bros. animated television series Animaniacs included a spoof of Goodnight Moon named "Nighty-Night Toon".

The Goodnight Moon Game, by Briar Patch, is a memory game for very young children. It won a 1998 Parents' Choice Gold Award and a 1999 Oppenheim Toy Portfolio Platinum Award.

The January 13, 2002 edition of the comic strip Zits featured Jeremy Duncan, the main character, reciting a parody of the book; his room and curtains resembled those in the book.

In 2010, CollegeHumor posted five science fiction spoofs of well-known children's stories, including a mashup of Goodnight Moon and Frank Herbert's novel Dune, entitled Goodnight Dune.

A parody written by David Milgrim and published under the pseudonym “Ann Droyd” in October 2011, Goodnight iPad: a Parody for the next generation “shows a very different homelife 50 years later, with mobile devices, social networks, and non-stop streaming media.”

The University of Minnesota Press published the 2015 book Goodnight Loon, full of Minnesota Northwoods language. The original text's bunny is replaced by the university's mascot, Goldy Gopher.

Mad Magazine published a parody of the book starring Batman, titled "Goodnight, Batcave".

Catherynne M. Valente's 2021 novella The Past Is Red includes a character named Goodnight Moon.

Survivors of an extraterrestrial organism's killings in 2017 science-fiction film Life read excerpts from the book.

In the TV Series Mad Men (Season 5, Episode 11) Pete Campbell reads this book to his daughter.

The January 29, 2023 edition of the comic strip FoxTrot features Jason Fox reciting his own version of "Goodnight Moon" while shutting down the family desktop computer.

References

1947 children's books
American children's books
American picture books
Books about rabbits and hares
Books about night
Books by Margaret Wise Brown
Harper & Brothers books